Sławno is a PKP railway station in Sławno (West Pomeranian Voivodeship), Poland.

Train services
The station is served by the following services:

 Intercity services (IC) Łódź Fabryczna — Warszawa — Gdańsk Glowny — Kołobrzeg
Intercity services (IC) Szczecin - Koszalin - Słupsk - Gdynia - Gdańsk
Intercity services (IC) Szczecin - Koszalin - Słupsk - Gdynia - Gdańsk - Elbląg/Iława - Olsztyn
Intercity services (IC) Szczecin - Koszalin - Słupsk - Gdynia - Gdańsk - Elbląg - Olsztyn - Białystok
Intercity services (IC) Ustka - Koszalin - Poznań - Wrocław - Opole - Bielsko-Biała
Intercity services (IC) Ustka - Koszalin - Poznań - Wrocław - Katowice - Kraków - Rzeszów - Przemyśl
Intercity services (IC) Słupsk - Koszalin - Poznań - Wrocław
Intercity services (IC) Słupsk - Koszalin - Poznań - Wrocław - Opole - Katowice
Intercity services (TLK) Kołobrzeg — Gdynia Główna — Warszawa Wschodnia — Kraków Główny

Regional services (R) Słupsk — Koszalin
Regional services (R) Słupsk — Koszalin — Kołobrzeg
Regional services (R) Słupsk — Koszalin — Szczecin Główny
Regional services(R) Słupsk — DarłowoPolregio. PR 80997 Słupsk — Darłowo. Timetable. https://bilety.polregio.pl/pociag/REG/80997

References 

Railway stations in West Pomeranian Voivodeship
Sławno County